Moses Fowler was Dean of Ripon from 1604 until his death in March 1608.

From Kent, Fowler was educated at Corpus Christi College, Cambridge. He held livings at Aylsham, Brandesburton and Sigglesthorne.

References

Alumni of Corpus Christi College, Cambridge
Deans of Ripon
1608 deaths
People from Kent